Viktoriya is a given name. Notable people with the name include:

Viktoriya Beloslydtseva (born 1972), athlete from Kazakhstan
Viktoriya Fyodorova (born 1973), female high jumper from Russia
Viktoriya Gurova (born 1982), Russian triple jumper
Viktoriya Klimina (born 1976), Russian long-distance runner
Viktoriya Klyugina (born 1980), Russian high jumper
Viktoriya Koval (born 1985), athlete from Ukraine who competes in archery
Viktoriya Kravchenko, Paralympian athlete from Ukraine competing mainly in category T37 sprint events
Viktoriya Kutuzova (born 1988), female tennis player from Ukraine
Viktoriya Mitina, Russian politician
Viktoriya Rybalko (born 1982), Ukrainian long jumper
Viktoriya Styopina (born 1976), Ukrainian high jumper
Viktoriya Tokareva (born 1937), Russian screenwriter and short story writer
Viktoriya Tokonbayeva (born 1975), retired Kazakhstani sprinter who specialized in the 100 metres
Viktoriya Tolstoganova (born 1972), Russian film and theater actress
Viktoriya Tomova (born 1995), Bulgarian professional tennis player
Viktoriya Troytskaya (born 1969), Russian short track speed skater
Viktoriya Vershynina (born 1971), retired Ukrainian long jumper
Viktoriya Yermolyeva (born 1978), Ukrainian pianist
Viktoriya Zeynep Güneş (born 1998), Ukrainian and Turkish swimmer

See also
Viktoria (disambiguation) variant of Viktoriya
Victoria (disambiguation)
Vittoria (disambiguation)

Russian feminine given names